Étienne Djaument (born 11 November 1911, date of death unknown) was an Ivorian politician who was elected to the French Senate in 1947. He was a member of the Groupe de l'Union Républicaine et Résistante pour l'Union Française, affiliated with the French Communist Party. Later Djaument became the president of the Eburnean Democratic Bloc. In 1961 he was named Ivorian ambassador to Nigeria.

References 

1911 births
Year of death unknown
Ambassadors of Ivory Coast to Nigeria
French Senators of the Fourth Republic
Ivorian politicians
Senators of French West Africa